is a Japanese actor. He has appeared in more than 50 films since 1979.

Selected filmography

Films

Television

References

External links 

1951 births
Living people
Japanese male film actors